Mount Cook (or Boundary Peak 182) is a high peak on the Yukon Territory-Alaska border, in the Saint Elias Mountains of North America. It is approximately 15 miles southwest of Mount Vancouver and 35 miles east-southeast of Mount Saint Elias. It forms one of the corners of the jagged border, which is defined to run in straight lines between the major peaks. The same border also separates Kluane National Park in the Yukon Territory from Wrangell-St. Elias National Park and Preserve in Alaska.

Like many peaks of the Saint Elias Mountains, Mount Cook is a massive peak, with a large rise above local terrain.

Mount Cook was first climbed in 1953. It is not often climbed due to its remoteness, the size of the mountain, the typically poor weather (due to its proximity to the ocean), and the fact that it is not one of the highest peaks of the range. In fact there are only four references to the peak in the complete index of the American Alpine Journal.

See also

List of mountain peaks of North America
List of mountain peaks of Canada
List of mountain peaks of the United States
List of Boundary Peaks of the Alaska-British Columbia/Yukon border

Notes
  This is according to bivouac.com, the Canadian Mountain Encyclopedia, quoting the Canadian NTS map. The USGS map has an elevation that is 6 feet lower.
  According to bivouac.com, the NTS map shows the high point substantially north of the international border (much as with Mount Vancouver). The USGS shows the summit to be right on the border.

References

External links

 Mount Cook on bivouac.com
 Mount Cook on Topozone
 Index of the American Alpine Journal, A-K
 "Mount Cook, Yukon Territory/Alaska" on Peakbagger

Mountains of Alaska
Four-thousanders of Yukon
Saint Elias Mountains
Mountains of Yakutat City and Borough, Alaska
Wrangell–St. Elias National Park and Preserve
Kluane National Park and Reserve
Canada–United States border
International mountains of North America
Mount Cook